Daouda Kante (born July 16, 1978) is a Malian retired footballer who played as a defender. He spent three seasons in Major League Soccer, and two in the Major Indoor Soccer League. Currently, he is the executive and technical director for Kansas Rush Soccer – Olathe.

Youth
A native of Mali, Kante attended Saint Benedict's Preparatory School in New Jersey, United States, where he played on the school's 1996 state championship soccer team. In 1998, he entered Mercer Community College where he was a junior college All-American soccer player. In 1999, he transferred to Florida International University. He began his career with the Golden Panthers in midfield, but moved to defense in 2000. In February 2001, the Miami Fusion selected Kanté in the 6th round (64th overall) of the 2001 MLS SuperDraft. However, he chose not to sign with the Fusion in order to complete his degree. He graduated with a bachelor's degree in international business and international relations.

Professional
During his collegiate career, he played for the Central Jersey Riptide and the Tampa Bay Hawks of the Premier Development League.  In 2002, D.C. United drafted Kanté in the first round (11th overall) in the 2002 MLS SuperDraft, but he never played a first team game.  Instead, D.C. sent him on loan to the Wilmington Hammerheads of the USL D-3 Pro League at the end of April.  He played two games on loan to the Hampton Roads Mariners on June 2002.  United waived him on June 3, 2002 and on July 19, 2002 the New England Revolution signed Kanté as a transitional international.  He played well for the Revolution that season, but injury and fitness issues led to him seeing little playing time over the next two seasons. The Revolution released him in 2004.  In the fall of 2004, he signed with the St. Louis Steamers of Major Indoor Soccer League.  He played only one game before being traded to the Baltimore Blast in exchange for a third round pick in the 2006 MISL Amateur Draft.  He finished his career with the Blast in the 2005–2006 season.

References

External links
 MLS Stats
  Baltimore Blast

1978 births
Living people
Baltimore Blast (2001–2008 MISL) players
Central Jersey Riptide players
D.C. United players
Expatriate soccer players in the United States
FIU Panthers men's soccer players
Association football defenders
Virginia Beach Mariners players
Major Indoor Soccer League (2001–2008) players
Major League Soccer players
Malian expatriate footballers
Malian expatriate sportspeople in the United States
Malian footballers
New England Revolution players
St. Louis Steamers (2003–2006 MISL) players
Tampa Bay Hawks players
USL League Two players
Wilmington Hammerheads FC players
USL Second Division players
A-League (1995–2004) players
D.C. United draft picks
Miami Fusion draft picks
People from Mopti Region
MCCC Vikings men's soccer players
Soccer players from New Jersey
21st-century Malian people